Half width may refer to
Full width at half maximum
halfwidth and fullwidth forms
Half-width kana